Liotella compacta is a species of minute sea snail, a marine gastropod mollusc in the family Skeneidae.

Description
The diameter of the shell attains 1.3 mm.

Distribution
This marine species is endemic to Australia and occurs off South Australia and Tasmania.

References

 Petterd, W. 1884. Description of new Tasmanian shells. Journal of Conchology 4: 135-145
 Cotton, B. C., 1959. South Australian Mollusca. Archaeogastropoda.  W.L. Hawes, Adelaide.. 449 pp., 1 pl.

External links
 

compacta
Gastropods of Australia
Gastropods described in 1884